Clayton Travis Snyder (born September 9, 1987) is an American actor who played Ethan Craft on the Disney Channel series Lizzie McGuire and in its film adaptation, The Lizzie McGuire Movie.

Biography
Clayton Snyder was born in Los Angeles, California to Glenda Pack and Steve Snyder. He is of German and Italian descent, and has four older half-brothers, Doug, Derk, Darry and Devin. Snyder graduated from Los Alamitos High School in Los Alamitos, California as senior class vice-president in June 2006. He then attended Pepperdine University and was a member of the water polo team from 2006 to 2009, and earned All-America Honorable Mention as a senior in 2009.

Filmography

References

External links
 
 

1987 births
21st-century American male actors
American male child actors
American male film actors
American male television actors
American people of German descent
American people of Italian descent
Living people
Male actors from Los Angeles
Male actors from Orange County, California
People from Los Alamitos, California